The 1937–38 season was the 65th season of competitive football in Scotland and the 48th season of the Scottish Football League.

Scottish League Division One 

Champions: Celtic
Relegated: Dundee, Morton

Scottish League Division Two 

Promoted: Raith Rovers, Albion Rovers

Scottish Cup 

East Fife were winners of the Scottish Cup after a 4–2 extra time win in a replay against Kilmarnock.

Other honours

National

County 

 * – aggregate over two legs

Highland League

Junior Cup 
Cambuslang Rangers were winners of the Junior Cup after a 3–2 win over Benburb in the final.

Scotland national team 

Key:
 (H) = Home match
 (A) = Away match
 BHC = British Home Championship

Notes and references

External links 
 Scottish Football Historical Archive

 
Seasons in Scottish football